USS Francis M. Robinson (DE-220), a  of the United States Navy, was named in honor of Commander Francis M. Robinson (1883–1942), who was a recipient of the Navy Cross.

Francis M. Robinson was launched on 1 May 1943 by Philadelphia Navy Yard; sponsored by Mrs. Francis M. Robinson, widow of Commander Robinson; and commissioned on 15 January 1944.

Service history
After a period of service as escort along the east coast, Francis M. Robinson arrived at Norfolk, Virginia on 2 May 1944 to join the  hunter-killer group, an outstandingly successful anti-submarine force in whose Presidential Unit Citation Francis M. Robinson was to share.

Upon the return of the Bogue group to New York on 4 July, Francis M. Robinson was detached. She served briefly to aid submarines in training out of New London, Connecticut, and on 2 August sailed from New York on the first of five convoy escort voyages to north African ports. During the fourth such voyage, on 17 February as the convoy formed up to pass eastward through the Strait of Gibraltar, two of the merchantmen were torpedoed. Francis M. Robinson saw one sail off to port under her own power, and remained with the other, sending a damage control party on board to assist in stopping flooding, until a tug came out of Gibraltar.

Completing her convoy duty on 15 May 1945, Francis M. Robinson aided submarines training out of New London, and was school ship at the Naval Training Center at Miami, and from November through February 1946 served as plane guard for carriers training in Chesapeake Bay.

She first arrived at Key West, her base for the remainder of her naval career, on 6 February 1947, and from that time conducted development operations in anti-submarine warfare. Her activities took her on cruises along the east coast and throughout the Caribbean and Gulf of Mexico, and were varied with participation in exercises of many types. Francis M. Robinson was placed out of commission in reserve at Philadelphia on 20 June 1960.

Francis M. Robinson was struck from the Naval Vessel Register on 1 July 1972, and sold for scrap on 12 July 1973.

Awards
In addition to the Presidential Unit Citation, Francis M. Robinson received one battle star for World War II service.

References

External links 
 

 

Buckley-class destroyer escorts
Ships built in Philadelphia
World War II frigates and destroyer escorts of the United States
1943 ships